The Arrondissement of Bastogne is one of the five administrative arrondissements in the Walloon province of Luxembourg, Belgium. It is not a judicial arrondissement. Three of its municipalities, Gouvy, Houffalize and Vielsalm, are part of the Judicial Arrondissement of Marche-en-Famenne, while the rest of its municipalities are part of the Judicial Arrondissement of Neufchâteau.

Municipalities
The Administrative Arrondissement of Bastogne consists of the following municipalities:
 Bastogne
 Bertogne
 Fauvillers
 Gouvy
 Houffalize
 Sainte-Ode
 Vaux-sur-Sûre
 Vielsalm

References 

Bastogne